Andrew Dice Clay (born Andrew Clay Silverstein; September 29, 1957) is an American stand-up comedian and actor. He rose to prominence in the late 1980s with a brash, deliberately offensive persona known as "The Diceman". In 1990, he became the first stand-up comedian to sell out Madison Square Garden for two consecutive nights. That same year, he played the lead role in the comedy-mystery film The Adventures of Ford Fairlane.

Clay has appeared in several films and television shows, including critically acclaimed supporting roles in Woody Allen's Blue Jasmine (2013) and Bradley Cooper's directorial debut A Star Is Born (2018). He continues his acting career while also touring and performing stand-up. The television show Dice aired on Showtime for two seasons. He also launched a podcast, I'm Ova Hea' Now, in September 2018.

Early life
Clay was born to parents Jacqueline and Fred Silverstein in the Sheepshead Bay neighborhood of Brooklyn in New York City, where he was raised. He is Jewish. He has one sister. Clay's father was a boxer and real estate agent.

At age five, Clay was entertaining his family with impressions, and by seven he was playing drums, inspired by the sounds of big band music. Clay attended James Madison High School in Brooklyn and as a teenager worked as a drummer on the Catskill Mountains circuit in the 1970s playing bar mitzvahs and weddings under the name Clay Silvers. Upon returning to New York City, he failed to form a big band of his own. He pursued higher education but dropped out to become a full-time comedian. Clay cites Elvis Presley, Fonzie, John Travolta, and Sylvester Stallone as his heroes.

Career

1970s
Clay began his stand-up career in 1978 when he auditioned at Pips comedy club in Sheepshead Bay, which turned into a headline spot at the venue the following week, billed as Andrew Clay. He started with an act mainly of impressions, which included a character named "The Diceman", based on Jerry Lewis as Buddy Love from The Nutty Professor, which transformed into John Travolta in Grease. It took him three weeks to prepare the act. A picture of him on stage during his early sets at Pips was described: "[Clay] In a baggy white shirt, pants rolled up to his knees and a pair of thick glasses", with a black leather jacket underneath the shirt so he could seamlessly switch to his Travolta character when the lights went out. With his new act, Clay graduated to larger and more prestigious comedy venues including The Improv, Catch a Rising Star, and Dangerfield's. He recalled his father being supportive of his act during one performance at the latter. "He knew it was different right off the bat [...] He saw it worked". The persona was more of a shock to his mother, but she got used to it and he recalled her laughing at his jokes.

1980s
By 1980, Clay had relocated to Los Angeles and landed work at the Comedy Store, owned by Mitzi Shore. His sets were not an instant hit, and because of his dirty act and her unwillingness to have other comics follow him, Shore had Clay perform at late hours, resorting for him "to wait and perform for ten drunks". In 1982, Clay landed his first film role, appearing in Wacko. In 1983, Clay added the "Diceman" moniker to his name and no longer relied on impressions of other notable figures, instead creating an alter ego based on his heroes. He first used the act at the Comedy Store after he was asked to fill in for a comic who cancelled their spot. He said: "I didn't have my Jerry Lewis stuff with me, so I just winged it, saying whatever popped in my head".

His performances at the venue led to his first sitcom roles with appearances on M*A*S*H and Diff'rent Strokes, and feature-length films, including Making the Grade (1984), Pretty in Pink (1986), and Casual Sex? (1988). A review by the Los Angeles Times critic Michael Wilmington described Clay's character in the latter, named "The Vin Man" and based on his Diceman persona, as "a macho bozo from Jersey". From 1986 to 1988, he had a regular role as Max Goldman on Crime Story. His act included a drum solo as a tribute to Buddy Rich. Clay then pursued stand-up comedy full-time as the Dice character.

Clay's breakthrough came in 1988 when he performed at an all-male Big Brother Association dinner event with "all of Hollywood's royalty [...] dressed in tuxedos and I show up in a black leather jacket with a flag on the back that said 'Rock and Roll'". The set was a hit; the next day, 20th Century Fox offered him a film deal and entered talks with producer Joel Silver. Also in 1988, Clay performed a seven-minute set at Dangerfield's in New York City for Rodney Dangerfield's HBO stand-up showcase special Nothing Goes Right, launching him into the national spotlight.

In 1989, Clay was named Comedy Act of the Year by readers of Performance magazine. In March 1989, he released his debut comedy album Dice, which went on to reach gold certification by the RIAA for selling over 500,000 copies in the US. It peaked at No. 89 on the US Billboard 200. In September 1989, Clay performed a three-minute set at the 1989 MTV Video Music Awards, which included Otto Petersen's adult versions of the Mother Goose nursery rhymes. The incident led to MTV imposing a lifetime ban on Clay from appearing on the network. The ban was lifted in 2011.

In December 1989, Clay performed two unadvertised, largely improvised sets at Dangerfield's, which were recorded for his second comedy album, The Day the Laughter Died, produced by Rick Rubin. Released in March 1990 on Geffen Records, the album sold 250,000 copies in seven weeks, peaking at No. 39 on the Billboard 200.

1990s
In February 1990, Clay became the first comedian to sell out two consecutive nights at Madison Square Garden in New York City, totalling 38,000 people in attendance. Clay appeared on the Saturday Night Live episode of May 12, 1990, the fourth-highest-rated episode of the season. During the opening monologue, security guards removed protesters from the studio. Cast member Nora Dunn, refused to appear in the episode due to the perceived sexist and homophobic content in Clay's stand-up act. Despite NBC's use of a 5-second tape delay to enable them to cut offensive content from the live broadcast, one such remark escaped removal. Two days later, musical guest Sinéad O'Connor cancelled her scheduled appearance in protest.

Clay first met his agent Dennis Arfa at Dangerfield's, which led to his first HBO special, and ultimately his starring role in the 1990 film The Adventures of Ford Fairlane; in 1991, he received the Golden Raspberry Award for Worst Actor for his performance in the film.

In 1991, Clay ran his own production company, Fleebin Dabble Productions. He is featured on the front cover of the April 1991 issue of Penthouse, becoming the second male to front the magazine after George Burns. Footage of Clay's shows at Madison Square Garden was used to produce his 1991 stand-up concert film Dice Rules. His controversial act affected the number of venues that were willing to screen the film; it opened in 40 theatres nationwide on its opening day. It was originally planned for 20th Century Fox to release it, but it dropped out over the controversial material, leaving it to be picked up by Seven Arts. This was followed by the release of One Night With Dice that was filmed in 1986. A sell-out show at Symphony Hall in Salt Lake City in August 1991 was met with angry protesters outside the venue over his perceived-to-be homophobic and hateful material, during which police were called.

In 1993, ABC dropped a proposed one-hour television drama which was to feature Clay after management deemed him too controversial for the network. Clay had signed a one-year deal with ABC which kept him from working with other networks. In July 1993, Clay released No Apologies, the first stand-up concert pay-per-view special. It was purchased by over 250,000 homes to become the highest grossing non-sports pay-per-view event of the year. It was to feature Joey Buttafuoco but the plan was dropped following the publicity it attracted and upon the advice of his attorney. Clay followed it with a second pay television special, The Valentine's Day Massacre, which aired in around 100,000 homes. In 1994, Clay accepted more television roles.

In 1995, Clay released an HBO special Assume the Position. That same year, he signed a development deal with CBS and producer Bruce Helford, resulting in his starring role on the sitcom Bless This House. In mid-1995, Clay explained that the Diceman character had "sort of gone out of hand" which he felt happy about because it allowed him to pursue more television and film work than before. The situation led to a change in his stand-up act, focusing more on being a husband and a father yet still with an "edge".

In 1998, Clay released the triple album Filth through his website. Later in 1998, He began appearing on the New York City-based radio show Opie and Anthony. His opening act at the time, Jim Norton, became the show's co-host in late 2000.

2000s
In 2000, Clay released I'm Over Here Now and Banned for Life. Later in 2000, he released Face Down, Ass Up. He supported these with a nationwide tour that included a headline show at Madison Square Garden, ten years after his two sold-out performances.

In 2005, Clay signed a deal with Sirius Satellite Radio to broadcast his own show, Out of the Cage.

In 2007, he attempted a comeback with the reality TV series Dice: Undisputed on VH1, which lasted seven episodes.

He appeared as a part of NBC's The Celebrity Apprentice 2 and was the first celebrity to be fired after he openly entertained the idea of quitting while in Donald Trump's presence and calling Trump "Donny Trump". On The Howard Stern Show, Clay had stated that the show was edited to exclude situations where Trump treated Clay poorly based on his comic treatment of women rather than his accomplishments. Throughout the season, each celebrity was raising money for a charity of their choice; Clay had selected StandUp For Kids.

2010s
In July 2011, Clay was featured in the eighth and final season of Entourage as Johnny Drama's co-star in the fictional program Johnny's Bananas. Clay also appeared as himself in the Entourage film. He appeared in an episode of Raising Hope as himself which aired on November 29, 2011.

In May 2012, Clay appeared on The Joe Rogan Experience podcast and also did a set at The Bamboozle festival in Asbury Park. In December 2012, Clay had a stand-up comedy special on Showtime entitled Indestructible.

In May 2013, Clay began a podcast with Michael Wheels named Rollin' with Dice and Wheels...The Podcast. It ran for 46 original episodes, the last of which was released in December 2015.

Clay appeared with Cate Blanchett in Woody Allen's Blue Jasmine, which opened on July 26, 2013. In an interview with Good Day L.A., Clay stated that, as he had not been in a movie in 12 years, "It was a thrill to do something dramatic, something I've always wanted to do." His performance was critically praised.

In July 2013, Clay signed a book deal with Simon & Schuster for a memoir to be co-authored with David Ritz. In November 2014, Clay released his book The Filthy Truth.

In 2015, Clay hosted The Blue Show, showcasing some of his favorite blue comics, which was released on Showtime.

In 2016, Clay had a guest role as a record executive in the Martin Scorsese/Mick Jagger-produced television series Vinyl for HBO.

In 2017, Clay competed with his wife in the Fox reality cooking series My Kitchen Rules.

In September 2018, Dice launched his new podcast I'm Ova Hea' Now on the GaS Digital network. Later that year, he appeared as Lorenzo in the musical drama film A Star is Born, alongside Lady Gaga and Bradley Cooper, playing Gaga's character's father. Clay beat out several high-profile actors for the part, including Robert De Niro and Ray Liotta, and his performance went on to receive positive reviews, as did the film itself.

Personal life
Clay has married three times. From 1984 to 1986, he was married to Kathy Swanson. From 1992 to 2002, Clay was married to Kathleen "Trini" Monica. They had two sons, Maxwell Lee and Dillon Scott. Max has since followed his father's footsteps into stand-up comedy and occasionally opens for him on tour. Clay's third marriage was with hairstylist Valerie Vasquez, from 2010 to 2014. Clay was in an eight-year relationship with his ex-fiancée, comedian Eleanor Kerrigan.

In November 2017, Clay had a stent placed in a partially blocked artery. In August 2021, Clay was diagnosed with Bell's palsy, though the condition was declared temporary and he continues to perform live.

He lives in the Sherman Oaks neighborhood of Los Angeles.

In popular culture
On the third-season Murphy Brown episode "Brown and Blue", Murphy reluctantly is made to interview a rising yet crudely controversial comedian, Tony Rocket (Michael Chiklis), whose character is loosely modeled on Clay's "The Diceman" and his material during the height of his popularity.

A December 1990 episode of Night Court focuses on a raunchy comedian, Monte "The Potty Man" Potter, who alienates everyone with his jokes.

Discography
ADC: The Mixtape That Hates You (1988)
Dice (1989)
The Day the Laughter Died (1990)
Dice Rules (1991)
40 Too Long (1992)
The Day the Laughter Died, Part II (1993)
No Apologies (1993)
Filth (1998)
Face Down, Ass Up (2000)
Indestructible (2012)

Filmography

References

External links

 
 
 

1957 births
Living people
20th-century American comedians
21st-century American comedians
20th-century American male actors
21st-century American male actors
American male television actors
American male film actors
American memoirists
American stand-up comedians
Male actors from New York City
Jewish American male actors
Jewish American male comedians
Jewish male comedians
People from Sheepshead Bay, Brooklyn
Writers from Brooklyn
Comedians from New York City
James Madison High School (Brooklyn) alumni
Las Vegas shows
Participants in American reality television series
The Apprentice (franchise) contestants
Obscenity controversies in stand-up comedy
21st-century American Jews